Cingetorix (Gaulish "marching king" or "king of warriors") was one of the two chieftains struggling for the supremacy of the Treveri of Gaul. Caesar supported him over his more anti-Roman rival Indutiomarus. However Indutiomarus persuaded his people to join the revolt led by Ambiorix of the Eburones in 54 BC, declared Cingetorix a public enemy and confiscated his property. Cingetorix presented himself to Caesar's legate Titus Labienus, who defeated and killed Indutiomarus in a cavalry engagement.  The Treveri "transferred supreme rule to [Indutiomarus's] kinsmen," (6.2) and in 53 BC again mounted a campaign against the Roman troops led by Labienus.  They were again defeated.  At that point, Caesar writes, "Leadership and rule [over the Treveri] was handed over to Cingetorix, who...remained loyal from the beginning." (6.8)

See also
 Vercingetorix

References
 Julius Caesar, De Bello Gallico 5:3-4, 6:8

Celtic warriors
Gaulish rulers
1st-century BC rulers in Europe
Treveri